Thulo Dumba is a village development committee in the Bhojpur District and the Kosi Zone of eastern Nepal. According to the 1991 Nepal census, it had a population of 2604 people living in 537 individual households.

References

External links
UN map of the municipalities of Bhojpur District

Populated places in Bhojpur District, Nepal